Maglev (derived from magnetic levitation), is a system of train transportation that uses two sets of electromagnets: one set to repel and push the train up off the track, and another set to move the elevated train ahead, taking advantage of the lack of friction. There are both high speed, intercity maglev systems (over ), and low speed, urban maglev systems being built and under construction and development.

With maglev technology, the train travels along a guideway of electromagnets which control the train's stability and speed. While the propulsion and levitation require no moving parts, the bogies can move in relation to the main body of the vehicle and some technologies require support by retractable wheels at low speeds under . This compares with electric multiple units that may have several dozen parts per bogie. Maglev trains can therefore in some cases be quieter and smoother than conventional trains and have the potential for much higher speeds.

Maglev vehicles have set several speed records, and maglev trains can accelerate and decelerate much faster than conventional trains; the only practical limitation is the safety and comfort of the passengers, although wind resistance at very high speeds can cause running costs that are four to five times that of conventional high-speed rail (such as the Tokaido Shinkansen). The power needed for levitation is typically not a large percentage of the overall energy consumption of a high-speed maglev system. Overcoming drag, which makes all open-air land transport more energy intensive at higher speeds, takes the most energy. Vactrain technology has been proposed as a means to overcome this limitation. Maglev systems have been much more expensive to construct than conventional train systems, although the simpler construction of maglev vehicles makes them cheaper to manufacture and maintain.

The line is the fastest operational high-speed maglev train, designed to connect Shanghai Pudong International Airport and the outskirts of central Pudong, Shanghai. For the first time, the launch generated wide public interest and media attention, propelling the popularity of the mode of transportation. It is also the only maglev train in the world that can be considered as high speed.

Despite over a century of research and development, there are only six operational maglev trains today — three in China, two in South Korea, and one in Japan. Maglev can be hard to economically justify for certain locations, however it has notable benefits over conventional railway systems, which includes lower operating and maintenance costs (with zero rolling friction its parts do not wear out quickly and hence less need to replace parts often), significantly lower odds of derailment (due to its design), an extremely quiet and smooth ride for passengers, little to no air pollution, and the railcars can be built wider and make it more comfortable and spacious for passengers. And also because it can travel up higher ascending grades (up to 10 percent), compared to conventional trains (up to 4 percent or less), maglev trains can also reduce the need to create new tunnels or to level the landscape to build its tracks.

Development 
In the late 1940s, the British electrical engineer Eric Laithwaite, a professor at Imperial College London, developed the first full-size working model of the linear induction motor. He became professor of heavy electrical engineering at Imperial College in 1964, where he continued his successful development of the linear motor. Since linear motors do not require physical contact between the vehicle and guideway, they became a common fixture on advanced transportation systems in the 1960s and 1970s. Laithwaite joined one such project, the Tracked Hovercraft RTV-31, based near Cambridge, UK, although the project was cancelled in 1973.

The linear motor was naturally suited to use with maglev systems as well. In the early 1970s, Laithwaite discovered a new arrangement of magnets, the magnetic river, that allowed a single linear motor to produce both lift and forward thrust, allowing a maglev system to be built with a single set of magnets. Working at the British Rail Research Division in Derby, along with teams at several civil engineering firms, the "transverse-flux" system was developed into a working system.

The first commercial maglev people mover was simply called "MAGLEV" and officially opened in 1984 near Birmingham, England. The system was closed in 1995 due to reliability problems.

History

First maglev patent 
High-speed transportation patents were granted to various inventors throughout the world.  The first relevant patent,  (2 December 1902), issued to Albert C. Albertson, used magnetic levitation to take part of the weight off of the wheels while using conventional propulsion.

Early United States patents for a linear motor propelled train were awarded to German inventor Alfred Zehden. In 1907, another early electromagnetic transportation system was developed by F. S. Smith. In 1908, Cleveland mayor Tom L. Johnson filed a patent for a wheel-less "high-speed railway" levitated by an induced magnetic field. Jokingly known as "Greased Lightning," the suspended car operated on a 90-foot test track in Johnson's basement "absolutely noiseless[ly] and without the least vibration." A series of German patents for magnetic levitation trains propelled by linear motors were awarded to Hermann Kemper between 1937 and 1941. The first use of "maglev" in a United States patent was in "Magnetic levitation guidance system" by Canadian Patents and Development Limited.

New York, United States, 1968 
In 1959, while delayed in traffic on the Throgs Neck Bridge, James Powell, a researcher at Brookhaven National Laboratory (BNL), thought of using magnetically levitated transportation. Powell and BNL colleague Gordon Danby worked out a maglev concept using static magnets mounted on a moving vehicle to induce electrodynamic lifting and stabilizing forces in specially shaped loops, such as figure-of-8 coils on a guideway. These were patented in 1968–1969.

Japan, 1969–present 
Japan operates two independently developed maglev trains. One is HSST (and its descendant, the Linimo line) by Japan Airlines and the other, which is more well known, is SCMaglev by the Central Japan Railway Company.

The development of the latter started in 1969. The first successful SCMaglev run was made on a short track at the Japanese National Railways' (JNR's) Railway Technical Research Institute in 1972. Maglev trains on the Miyazaki test track (a later, 7 km long test track) regularly hit  by 1979. After an accident which destroyed the train, a new design was selected. In Okazaki, Japan (1987), the SCMaglev was used for test rides at the Okazaki exhibition. The track has since been extended to almost . The current  world speed record for crewed trains was set there in 2015.

Development of HSST started in 1974. In Tsukuba, Japan (1985), the HSST-03 (Linimo) became popular at the Tsukuba World Exposition, in spite of its low  top speed. In Saitama, Japan (1988), the HSST-04-1 was revealed at the Saitama exhibition in Kumagaya.

Construction of a new high-speed maglev line, the Chuo Shinkansen, started in 2014. It is being built by extending the SCMaglev test track in Yamanashi in both directions. The completion date is currently unknown, with the most recent estimate of 2027 no longer possible following a local governmental rejection of a construction permit.

Hamburg, Germany, 1979 
Transrapid 05 was the first maglev train with longstator propulsion licensed for passenger transportation. In 1979, a  track was opened in Hamburg for the first International Transportation Exhibition (IVA 79). Interest was sufficient that operations were extended three months after the exhibition finished, having carried more than 50,000 passengers. It was reassembled in Kassel in 1980.

Ramenskoye, Moscow, USSR, 1979 
 

In 1979 the USSR town of Ramenskoye (Moscow oblast) built an experimental test site for running experiments with cars on magnetic suspension. The test site consisted of a 60-metre ramp which was later extended to 980 metres. From the late 1970s to the 1980s five prototypes of cars were built that received designations from TP-01 (ТП-01) to TP-05 (ТП-05). The early cars were supposed to reach the speed up to 100 km/h.

The construction of a maglev track using the technology from Ramenskoye started in Armenian SSR in 1987 and was planned to be completed in 1991. The track was supposed to connect the cities of Yerevan and Sevan via the city of Abovyan. The original design speed was 250 km/h which was later lowered to 180 km/h. However, the Spitak earthquake in 1988 and the First Nagorno-Karabakh War caused the project to freeze. In the end the overpass was only partially constructed.

In the early 1990s, the maglev theme was continued by the Engineering Research Center "TEMP" (ИНЦ "ТЭМП") this time by the order from the Moscow government. The project was named V250 (В250). The idea was to build a high-speed maglev train to connect Moscow to the Sheremetyevo airport. The train would consist of 64-seater cars and run at speeds up to 250 km/h. In 1993, due to the financial crisis, the project was abandoned. However, from 1999 the "TEMP" research center had been participating as a co-developer in the creation of the linear motors for the Moscow Monorail system.

Birmingham, United Kingdom, 1984–1995 

The world's first commercial maglev system was a low-speed maglev shuttle that ran between the airport terminal of Birmingham International Airport and the nearby Birmingham International railway station between 1984 and 1995. It operated for 11 years and was initially very popular with passengers, but obsolescence problems with the electronic systems made it progressively unreliable as years passed, leading to its closure in 1995. One of the original cars is now on display at Railworld in Peterborough, together with the RTV31 hover train vehicle. Another is on display at the National Railway Museum in York.

Several favourable conditions existed when the link was built:
 The British Rail Research vehicle was 3 tonnes and extension to the 8-tonne vehicle was easy.
 Electrical power was available.
 The airport and rail buildings were suitable for terminal platforms.
 Only one crossing over a public road was required and no steep gradients were involved.
 Land was owned by the railway or airport.
 Local industries and councils were supportive.
 Some government finance was provided and because of sharing work, the cost per organization was low.

After the system closed in 1995, the original guideway lay dormant until 2003, when a replacement cable-hauled system, the AirRail Link Cable Liner people mover, was opened.

Emsland, Germany, 1984–2012 

The single-track line ran between Dörpen and Lathen with turning loops at each end. Paying passengers were carried as part of the testing process. The construction of the test facility began in 1980 and finished in 1984.

In 2006, the Lathen maglev train accident occurred, killing 23 people. It was found to have been caused by human error in implementing safety checks. From 2006 no passengers were carried. At the end of 2011 the operation licence expired and was not renewed, and in early 2012 demolition permission was given for its facilities, including the track and factory.

In March 2021 it was reported the CRRC  was investigating reviving the Emsland test track.  In May 2019 CRRC had unveiled its 'CRRC 600' prototype which is designed to reach .

Vancouver, Canada and Hamburg, Germany, 1986–88 

In Vancouver, Canada, the HSST-03 by HSST Development Corporation (Japan Airlines and Sumitomo Corporation) was exhibited at Expo 86, and ran on a  test track that provided guests with a ride in a single car along a short section of track at the fairgrounds. It was removed after the fair. It was shown at the Aoi Expo in 1987 and is now on static display at Okazaki Minami Park.

Berlin, Germany, 1984–1992 

In West Berlin, the M-Bahn was built in 1984. It was a driverless maglev system with a  track connecting three stations. Testing with passenger traffic started in August 1989, and regular operation started in July 1991. Although the line largely followed a new elevated alignment, it terminated at Gleisdreieck U-Bahn station, where it took over an unused platform for a line that formerly ran to East Berlin. After the fall of the Berlin Wall, plans were set in motion to reconnect this line (today's U2). Deconstruction of the M-Bahn line began only two months after regular service began and was completed during February 1992.

South Korea, 1993–present 

This final model was incorporated in the Incheon Airport Maglev which opened on 3 February 2016, making South Korea the world's fourth country to operate its own self-developed maglev after the United Kingdom's Birmingham International Airport, Germany's Berlin M-Bahn, and Japan's Linimo. It links Incheon International Airport to the Yongyu Station and Leisure Complex on Yeongjong island. It offers a transfer to the Seoul Metropolitan Subway at AREX's Incheon International Airport Station and is offered free of charge to anyone to ride, operating between 9am and 6pm with 15-minute intervals.

The maglev system was co-developed by the South Korea Institute of Machinery and Materials (KIMM) and Hyundai Rotem.

Once completed it will become a circular line.

Germany/China, 2010–present 
Transport System Bögl (TSB) is a driverless maglev system developed by the German construction company Max Bögl since 2010. Its primary intended use is for short to medium distances (up to 30 km) and speeds up to 150 km/h for uses such as airport shuttles. The company has been doing test runs on an 820-meter-long test track at their headquarters in Sengenthal, Upper Palatinate, Germany, since 2012 clocking over 100,000 tests covering a distance of over 65,000 km as of 2018.

In 2018 Max Bögl signed a joint venture with the Chinese company Chengdu Xinzhu Road & Bridge Machinery Co. with the Chinese partner given exclusive rights of production and marketing for the system in China. The joint venture constructed a  demonstration line near Chengdu, China, and two vehicles were airlifted there in June, 2020.

China, 2000-present 
According to the International Maglev Board there are at least four maglev research programmes underway in China at the following institutions: Southwest Jiaotong University (Chengdu), Tongji University (Shanghai), CRRC Tangshan-Changchun Railway Vehicle Co. and Chengdu Aircraft Industry Group.  The latest high speed prototype, unveiled in July 2021, was manufactured by CRRC Qingdao Sifang.

Low-to-medium speed 
Development of the low-to-medium speed systems, that is, by the CRRC has led to opening of operational lines such as the Changsha Maglev Express in 2016 and the Line S1 in Beijing in 2017.  
The vehicle, under development since 2018, has a 30 percent increase in traction efficiency and a 60 percent increase in speed over the stock in use on the line since.

High speed  

There are currently two competing efforts into high-speed maglev systems, i.e., .  
 The first is based on the Transrapid technology used in the Shanghai maglev train and is developed by the CRRC under license from Thyssen-Krupp. 
 In 2006 the  CM1 Dolphin prototype was unveiled and began testing on a new  test track at Tongji University, northwest of Shanghai.
 A prototype vehicle of the  CRRC 600 was developed in 2019 and tested from June 2020. 
 In March 2021 a  model began trials.
It was reported to be the world's fastest ground vehicle.
 A high speed test track is under development in China and also, in April 2021, there was consideration given to re-opening the Emsland test facility in Germany.
 A second, incompatible high-speed prototype was unveiled in January 2021.

Technology 

In the public imagination, "maglev" often evokes the concept of an elevated monorail track with a linear motor. Maglev systems may be monorail or dual rail—the SCMaglev MLX01 for instance uses a trench-like track—and not all monorail trains are maglevs. Some railway transport systems incorporate linear motors but use electromagnetism only for propulsion, without levitating the vehicle. Such trains have wheels and are not maglevs. Maglev tracks, monorail or not, can also be constructed at grade or underground in tunnels. Conversely, non-maglev tracks, monorail or not, can be elevated or underground too. Some maglev trains do incorporate wheels and function like linear motor-propelled wheeled vehicles at slower speeds but levitate at higher speeds. This is typically the case with electrodynamic suspension maglev trains. Aerodynamic factors may also play a role in the levitation of such trains.

The two main types of maglev technology are:
 Electromagnetic suspension (EMS), electronically controlled electromagnets in the train attract it to a magnetically conductive (usually steel) track.
 Electrodynamic suspension (EDS) uses superconducting electromagnets or strong permanent magnets that create a magnetic field, which induces currents in nearby metallic conductors when there is relative movement, which pushes and pulls the train towards the designed levitation position on the guide way.

Electromagnetic suspension (EMS) 

In electromagnetic suspension (EMS) systems, the train levitates above a steel rail while electromagnets, attached to the train, are oriented toward the rail from below. The system is typically arranged on a series of C-shaped arms, with the upper portion of the arm attached to the vehicle, and the lower inside edge containing the magnets. The rail is situated inside the C, between the upper and lower edges.

Magnetic attraction varies inversely with the square of distance, so minor changes in distance between the magnets and the rail produce greatly varying forces. These changes in force are dynamically unstable—a slight divergence from the optimum position tends to grow, requiring sophisticated feedback systems to maintain a constant distance from the track, (approximately ).

This eliminates the need for a separate low-speed suspension system, and can simplify track layout. On the downside, the dynamic instability demands fine track tolerances, which can offset this advantage. Eric Laithwaite was concerned that to meet required tolerances, the gap between magnets and rail would have to be increased to the point where the magnets would be unreasonably large. In practice, this problem was addressed through improved feedback systems, which support the required tolerances.

Electrodynamic suspension (EDS) 

In electrodynamic suspension (EDS), both the guideway and the train exert a magnetic field, and the train is levitated by the repulsive and attractive force between these magnetic fields. In some configurations, the train can be levitated only by repulsive force. In the early stages of maglev development at the Miyazaki test track, a purely repulsive system was used instead of the later repulsive and attractive EDS system. The magnetic field is produced either by superconducting magnets (as in JR–Maglev) or by an array of permanent magnets (as in Inductrack). The repulsive and attractive force in the track is created by an induced magnetic field in wires or other conducting strips in the track.

A major advantage of EDS maglev systems is that they are dynamically stable—changes in distance between the track and the magnets creates strong forces to return the system to its original position. In addition, the attractive force varies in the opposite manner, providing the same adjustment effects. No active feedback control is needed.

However, at slow speeds, the current induced in these coils and the resultant magnetic flux is not large enough to levitate the train. For this reason, the train must have wheels or some other form of landing gear to support the train until it reaches take-off speed. Since a train may stop at any location, due to equipment problems for instance, the entire track must be able to support both low- and high-speed operation.

Another downside is that the EDS system naturally creates a field in the track in front and to the rear of the lift magnets, which acts against the magnets and creates magnetic drag. This is generally only a concern at low speeds, and is one of the reasons why JR abandoned a purely repulsive system and adopted the sidewall levitation system. At higher speeds other modes of drag dominate.

The drag force can be used to the electrodynamic system's advantage, however, as it creates a varying force in the rails that can be used as a reactionary system to drive the train, without the need for a separate reaction plate, as in most linear motor systems. Laithwaite led development of such "traverse-flux" systems at his Imperial College laboratory. Alternatively, propulsion coils on the guideway are used to exert a force on the magnets in the train and make the train move forward. The propulsion coils that exert a force on the train are effectively a linear motor: an alternating current through the coils generates a continuously varying magnetic field that moves forward along the track. The frequency of the alternating current is synchronized to match the speed of the train. The offset between the field exerted by magnets on the train and the applied field creates a force moving the train forward.

Tracks 
The term "maglev" refers not only to the vehicles, but to the railway system as well, specifically designed for magnetic levitation and propulsion. All operational implementations of maglev technology make minimal use of wheeled train technology and are not compatible with conventional rail tracks. Because they cannot share existing infrastructure, maglev systems must be designed as standalone systems. The SPM maglev system is inter-operable with steel rail tracks and would permit maglev vehicles and conventional trains to operate on the same tracks.
MAN in Germany also designed a maglev system that worked with conventional rails, but it was never fully developed.

Evaluation 
Each implementation of the magnetic levitation principle for train-type travel involves advantages and disadvantages.

Neither Inductrack nor the Superconducting EDS are able to levitate vehicles at a standstill, although Inductrack provides levitation at much lower speed; wheels are required for these systems. EMS systems are wheel-free.

The German Transrapid, Japanese HSST (Linimo), and Korean Rotem EMS maglevs levitate at a standstill, with electricity extracted from guideway using power rails for the latter two, and wirelessly for Transrapid. If guideway power is lost on the move, the Transrapid is still able to generate levitation down to  speed, using the power from onboard batteries. This is not the case with the HSST and Rotem systems.

Propulsion 
EMS systems such as HSST/Linimo can provide both levitation and propulsion using an onboard linear motor. But EDS systems and some EMS systems such as Transrapid levitate but do not propel. Such systems need some other technology for propulsion. A linear motor (propulsion coils) mounted in the track is one solution. Over long distances coil costs could be prohibitive.

Stability 
Earnshaw's theorem shows that no combination of static magnets can be in a stable equilibrium. Therefore a dynamic (time varying) magnetic field is required to achieve stabilization. EMS systems rely on active electronic stabilization that constantly measures the bearing distance and adjusts the electromagnet current accordingly. EDS systems rely on changing magnetic fields to create currents, which can give passive stability.

Because maglev vehicles essentially fly, stabilisation of pitch, roll and yaw is required. In addition to rotation, surge (forward and backward motions), sway (sideways motion) or heave (up and down motions) can be problematic.

Superconducting magnets on a train above a track made out of a permanent magnet lock the train into its lateral position. It can move linearly along the track, but not off the track. This is due to the Meissner effect and flux pinning.

Guidance system 
Some systems use Null Current systems (also sometimes called Null Flux systems). These use a coil that is wound so that it enters two opposing, alternating fields, so that the average flux in the loop is zero. When the vehicle is in the straight ahead position, no current flows, but any moves off-line create flux that generates a field that naturally pushes/pulls it back into line.

Proposed technology enhancements

Evacuated tubes 

Some systems (notably the Swissmetro system and the Hyperloop) propose the use of vactrains—maglev train technology used in evacuated (airless) tubes, which removes air drag. This has the potential to increase speed and efficiency greatly, as most of the energy for conventional maglev trains is lost to aerodynamic drag.

One potential risk for passengers of trains operating in evacuated tubes is that they could be exposed to the risk of cabin depressurization unless tunnel safety monitoring systems can repressurize the tube in the event of a train malfunction or accident though since trains are likely to operate at or near the Earth's surface, emergency restoration of ambient pressure should be straightforward. The RAND Corporation has depicted a vacuum tube train that could, in theory, cross the Atlantic or the USA in around 21 minutes.

Rail-maglev hybrid 
The Polish startup Nevomo (previously Hyper Poland) is developing a system for modifying existing railway tracks into a maglev system, on which conventional wheel-rail trains, as well maglev vehicles can travel. Vehicles on this so-called ‘magrail’ system will be able to reach speeds of up to 300 km/h at significantly lower infrastructure costs than stand-alone maglev lines. Similar to proposed Vactrain systems, magrail is designed to allow a later-stage upgrade with a vacuum cover which will enable vehicles to reach speeds of up to 600 km/h due to reduced air pressure, making the system similar to a hyperloop, but without the necessity for dedicated infrastructure corridors.

Energy use 
Energy for maglev trains is used to accelerate the train. Energy may be regained when the train slows down via regenerative braking. It also levitates and stabilises the train's movement. Most of the energy is needed to overcome air drag. Some energy is used for air conditioning, heating, lighting and other miscellany.

At low speeds the percentage of power used for levitation can be significant, consuming up to 15% more power than a subway or light rail service. For short distances the energy used for acceleration might be considerable.

The force used to overcome air drag increases with the square of the velocity and hence dominates at high speed. The energy needed per unit distance increases by the square of the velocity and the time decreases linearly. However power increases by the cube of the velocity.

Aircraft take advantage of lower air pressure and lower temperatures by cruising at altitude to reduce energy consumption but unlike trains need to carry fuel on board. This has led to the suggestion of conveying maglev vehicles through partially evacuated tubes.

High-speed maglev comparison with conventional high speed trains 
Maglev transport is non-contact and electric powered. It relies less or not at all on the wheels, bearings and axles common to wheeled rail systems.

 Speed: Maglev allows higher top speeds than conventional rail. While experimental wheel-based high-speed trains have demonstrated similar speeds, conventional trains will suffer from friction between wheels and track and thus elevating the maintenance cost if operating at such speed, unlike levitated maglev trains. 
 Maintenance: Maglev trains currently in operation have demonstrated the need for minimal guideway maintenance. Vehicle maintenance is also minimal (based on hours of operation, rather than on speed or distance traveled). Traditional rail is subject to mechanical wear and tear that increases rapidly with speed, also increasing maintenance. For example: the wearing down of brakes and overhead wire wear have caused problems for the Fastech 360 rail Shinkansen. Maglev would eliminate these issues.
 Weather: In theory, maglev trains should be little affected by snow, ice, severe cold, rain or high winds. However, as of yet no maglev system has been installed in a location with such a harsh climate.
 Acceleration: Maglev vehicles accelerate and decelerate faster than mechanical systems regardless of the slickness of the guideway or the slope of the grade because they are non-contact systems.
 Track: Maglev trains are not compatible with conventional track, and therefore require custom infrastructure for their entire route. By contrast conventional high-speed trains such as the TGV are able to run, albeit at reduced speeds, on existing rail infrastructure, thus reducing expenditure where new infrastructure would be particularly expensive (such as the final approaches to city terminals), or on extensions where traffic does not justify new infrastructure. John Harding, former chief maglev scientist at the Federal Railroad Administration, claimed that separate maglev infrastructure more than pays for itself with higher levels of all-weather operational availability and nominal maintenance costs. These claims have yet to be proven in an intense operational setting and they do not consider the increased maglev construction costs. However, in countries like China, there are discussion of building some key conventional high speed rail tunnels/bridges to a standard that would allow them upgrading to maglev.
 Efficiency: Conventional rail is probably more efficient at lower speeds. But due to the lack of physical contact between the track and the vehicle, maglev trains experience no rolling resistance, leaving only air resistance and electromagnetic drag, potentially improving power efficiency. Some systems, however, such as the Central Japan Railway Company SCMaglev use rubber tires at low speeds, reducing efficiency gains.
 Weight: The electromagnets in many EMS and EDS designs require between 1 and 2 kilowatts per ton. The use of superconductor magnets can reduce the electromagnets' energy consumption. A 50-ton Transrapid maglev vehicle can lift an additional 20 tons, for a total of 70 tons, which consumes .
 Weight loading: High-speed rail requires more support and construction for its concentrated wheel loading. Maglev cars are lighter and distribute weight more evenly.
 Noise: Because the major source of noise of a maglev train comes from displaced air rather than from wheels touching rails, maglev trains produce less noise than a conventional train at equivalent speeds. However, the psychoacoustic profile of the maglev may reduce this benefit: a study concluded that maglev noise should be rated like road traffic, while conventional trains experience a 5–10 dB "bonus", as they are found less annoying at the same loudness level.
 Magnet reliability: Superconducting magnets are generally used to generate the powerful magnetic fields to levitate and propel the trains. These magnets must be kept below their critical temperatures (this ranges from 4.2 K to 77 K, depending on the material). New alloys and manufacturing techniques in superconductors and cooling systems have helped address this issue.
 Control systems: No signalling systems are needed for high-speed maglev, because such systems are computer controlled. Human operators cannot react fast enough to manage high-speed trains. High-speed systems require dedicated rights of way and are usually elevated. Two maglev system microwave towers are in constant contact with trains. There is no need for train whistles or horns, either.
 Terrain: Maglevs are able to ascend higher grades, offering more routing flexibility and reduced tunneling.

High-speed maglev comparison with aircraft 
Differences between airplane and maglev travel:

 Efficiency: For maglev systems the lift-to-drag ratio can exceed that of aircraft (for example Inductrack can approach 200:1 at high speed, far higher than any aircraft). This can make maglevs more efficient per kilometer. However, at high cruising speeds, aerodynamic drag is much larger than lift-induced drag. Jet-powered aircraft take advantage of low air density at high altitudes to significantly reduce air drag. Hence despite their lift-to-drag ratio disadvantage, they can travel more efficiently at high speeds than maglev trains that operate at sea level.
Additionally, maglevs can easily serve intermediate destinations.
 Availability: Maglevs are little affected by weather.
 Travel time: Maglevs do not face the extended security protocols faced by air travelers nor is time consumed for taxiing, or for queuing for take-off and landing.

Economics 

As more maglev systems are deployed, experts expect construction costs to drop by employing new construction methods and from economies of scale.

High speed systems 
The Shanghai maglev demonstration line cost US$1.2 billion to build in 2004. This total includes capital costs such as right-of-way clearing, extensive pile driving, on-site guideway manufacturing, in-situ pier construction at  intervals, a maintenance facility and vehicle yard, several switches, two stations, operations and control systems, power feed system, cables and inverters, and operational training. Ridership is not a primary focus of this demonstration line, since the Longyang Road station is on the eastern outskirts of Shanghai. Once the line is extended to South Shanghai Train station and Hongqiao Airport station, which may not happen because of economic reasons, ridership was expected to cover operation and maintenance costs and generate significant net revenue.

The South Shanghai extension was expected to cost approximately US$18 million per kilometre. In 2006, the German government invested $125 million in guideway cost reduction development that produced an all-concrete modular design that is faster to build and is 30% less costly. Other new construction techniques were also developed that put maglev at or below price parity with new high-speed rail construction.

The United States Federal Railroad Administration, in a 2005 report to Congress, estimated cost per mile of between US$50 million and US$100 million. The Maryland Transit Administration (MTA) Environmental Impact Statement estimated a pricetag at US$4.9 billion for construction, and $53 million a year for operations of its project.

The proposed Chuo Shinkansen maglev in Japan was estimated to cost approximately US$82 billion to build, with a route requiring long tunnels. A Tokaido maglev route replacing the current Shinkansen would cost 1/10 the cost, as no new tunnel would be needed, but noise pollution issues made this infeasible.

Low speed systems 
The Japanese Linimo HSST, cost approximately US$100 million/km to build. Besides offering improved operation and maintenance costs over other transit systems, these low-speed maglevs provide ultra-high levels of operational reliability and introduce little noise and generate zero air pollution into dense urban settings.

Records 
However, the operational and performance differences between these two very different technologies is far greater. The TGV record was achieved accelerating down a  slight decline, requiring 13 minutes. The MLX01 record, however, was achieved on the  Yamanashi test track – 1/8 the distance.

History of maglev speed records

Systems

Operational systems

High speed

Shanghai Maglev (2003) 

The line is the fastest, first commercially successful, operational Maglev train designed to connect Shanghai Pudong International Airport and the outskirts of central Pudong, Shanghai.

In January 2001, the Chinese signed an agreement with Transrapid to build an EMS high-speed maglev line to link Pudong International Airport with Longyang Road Metro station on the southeastern edge of Shanghai. On a 12 November 2003 system commissioning test run, it achieved , its designed top cruising speed. The Shanghai maglev is faster than Birmingham technology and comes with on-time—to the second—reliability greater than 99.97%.

Plans to extend the line to Shanghai South Railway Station and Hongqiao Airport on the northwestern edge of Shanghai are on hold. After the Shanghai–Hangzhou Passenger Railway became operational in late 2010, the maglev extension became somewhat redundant and may be cancelled.

Low speed

Linimo (Tobu Kyuryo Line, Japan) (2005) 

The commercial automated "Urban Maglev" system commenced operation in March 2005 in Aichi, Japan. More than 10 million passengers used this "urban maglev" line in its first three months of operation. At 100 km/h, it is sufficiently fast for frequent stops, has little or no noise impact on surrounding communities, can navigate short radius rights of way, and operates during inclement weather. The trains were designed by the Chubu HSST Development Corporation, which also operates a test track in Nagoya.

Daejeon Expo Maglev (2008) 
The first maglev test trials using electromagnetic suspension opened to public was HML-03, made by Hyundai Heavy Industries for the Daejeon Expo in 1993, after five years of research and manufacturing two prototypes, HML-01 and HML-02. Government research on urban maglev using electromagnetic suspension began in 1994. The first operating urban maglev was UTM-02 in Daejeon beginning on 21 April 2008 after 14 years of development and one prototype; UTM-01. The train runs on a  track between Expo Park and National Science Museum which has been shortened with the redevelopment of Expo Park. The track currently ends at the street parallel to the science museum. Meanwhile, UTM-02 conducted the world's first-ever maglev simulation. However, UTM-02 is still the second prototype of a final model. The final UTM model of Rotem's urban maglev, UTM-03, was used for a new line that opened in 2016 on Incheon's Yeongjong island connecting Incheon International Airport (see below).

Incheon Airport Maglev (2016) 

The Incheon Airport Maglev began commercial operation on 3 February 2016. It was developed and built domestically. Compared to Linimo, it has a more futuristic design thanks to it being lighter with construction costs cut to half. It connects Incheon International Airport with Yongyu Station, cutting journey time. It covers a distance of 6.1 km.

Changsha Maglev (2016) 

The Hunan provincial government launched the construction of a maglev line between Changsha Huanghua International Airport and Changsha South Railway Station, covering a distance of 18.55 km. Construction started in May 2014 and was completed by the end of 2015. Trial runs began on 26 December 2015 and trial operations started on 6 May 2016. As of 13 June 2018 the Changsha maglev had covered a distance of 1.7 million km and carried nearly 6 million passengers.

Beijing Line S1 (2017) 

Beijing has built China's second low-speed maglev line, Line S1, Beijing Subway, using technology developed by National University of Defense Technology. The line was opened on 30 December 2017.
The line operates at speeds up to 100 km/h.

Fenghuang Maglev (2022) 

Fenghuang Maglev (凤凰磁浮) is a medium- to low-speed maglev line in Fenghuang County, Xiangxi, Hunan province, China. The line operates at speeds up to 100 km/h. The first phase is 9.12 km with 4 stations (and 2 more future infill stations). The first phase opened on 30 July 2022 and connects the Fenghuanggucheng railway station on the Zhangjiajie–Jishou–Huaihua high-speed railway with the Fenghuang Folklore Garden.

Maglevs under construction

Chūō Shinkansen (Japan) 

 The Chuo Shinkansen is a high-speed maglev line in Japan. Construction began in 2014, commercial operations was expected to start by 2027. The 2027 target was given up in July 2020. The Linear Chuo Shinkansen Project aims to connect Tokyo and Osaka by way of Nagoya, the capital city of Aichi, in approximately one hour, less than half the travel time of the fastest existing bullet trains connecting the three metropolises. The full track between Tokyo and Osaka was originally expected to be completed in 2045, but the operator is now aiming for 2037.

The L0 Series train type is undergoing testing by the Central Japan Railway Company (JR Central) for eventual use on the Chūō Shinkansen line.

Qingyuan Maglev (China) 

Qingyuan Maglev (清远磁浮旅游专线) is a medium- to low-speed maglev line in Qingyuan, Guangdong province, China. The line will operate at speeds up to 100 km/h. The first phase is 8.1 km with 3 stations (and 1 more future infill station). The first phase was originally schedule to open in October 2020 and will connect the Yinzhan railway station on the Guangzhou–Qingyuan intercity railway with the Qingyuan Chimelong Theme Park. In the long term the line will be 38.5 km.

Test tracks

AMT test track – Powder Springs, Georgia, USA 
A June 2013 review of the technology called for an extensive testing program to be carried out to ensure the system complies with various regulatory requirements including the American Society of Civil Engineers (ASCE) People Mover Standard. The review noted that the test track is too short to assess the vehicles' dynamics at the maximum proposed speeds.

FTA's UMTD program, USA 
In the US, the Federal Transit Administration (FTA) Urban Maglev Technology Demonstration program funded the design of several low-speed urban maglev demonstration projects. It assessed HSST for the Maryland Department of Transportation and maglev technology for the Colorado Department of Transportation. The FTA also funded work by General Atomics at California University of Pennsylvania to evaluate the MagneMotion M3 and of the Maglev2000 of Florida superconducting EDS system. Other US urban maglev demonstration projects of note are the LEVX in Washington State and the Massachusetts-based Magplane.

San Diego, California USA 
General Atomics has a  test facility in San Diego, that is used to test Union Pacific's  freight shuttle in Los Angeles. The technology is "passive" (or "permanent"), using permanent magnets in a Halbach array for lift and requiring no electromagnets for either levitation or propulsion. General Atomics received US$90 million in research funding from the federal government. They are also considering their technology for high-speed passenger services.

SCMaglev, Yamanashi Japan 

Japan has a demonstration line in Yamanashi prefecture where test train SCMaglev L0 Series Shinkansen reached , faster than any wheeled trains. The demonstration line will become part of the Chūō Shinkansen linking Tokyo and Nagoya which, is currently under construction.

These trains use superconducting magnets, which allow for a larger gap, and repulsive/attractive-type electrodynamic suspension (EDS). In comparison, Transrapid uses conventional electromagnets and attractive-type electromagnetic suspension (EMS).

On 15 November 2014, The Central Japan Railway Company ran eight days of testing for the experimental maglev Shinkansen train on its test track in Yamanashi Prefecture.

Sengenthal, Germany and Chengdu, China 
Transport System Bögl, a division of German construction company Max Bögl, has built a test track in Sengenthal, Bavaria, Germany. In appearance, it's more like the German M-Bahn than the Transrapid system.
The vehicle tested on the track is patented in the US by Max Bögl. The company is also in a joint venture with a Chinese firm. A  demonstration line has been built near Chengdu, China and two vehicles were airlifted there in June, 2000.

Southwest Jiaotong University, China 
On 31 December 2000, the first crewed high-temperature superconducting maglev was tested successfully at Southwest Jiaotong University, Chengdu, China. This system is based on the principle that bulk high-temperature superconductors can be levitated stably above or below a permanent magnet. The system uses liquid nitrogen to cool the superconductor.

Jiading Campus of Tongji University, China 

A  maglev test track has been operating since 2006 at the Jiading Campus of Tongji University, northwest of Shanghai.  The track uses the same design as the operating Shanghai Maglev.  Top speed is restricted to  due to the length of track and its topology.

Proposed maglev systems 

Many maglev systems have been proposed in North America, Asia and Europe. Many are in the early planning stages or were explicitly rejected.

Australia 

Sydney-Illawarra
A maglev route was proposed between Sydney and Wollongong. The proposal came to prominence in the mid-1990s. The Sydney–Wollongong commuter corridor is the largest in Australia, with upwards of 20,000 people commuting each day. Current trains use the Illawarra line, between the cliff face of the Illawarra escarpment and the Pacific Ocean, with travel times about 2 hours. The proposal would cut travel times to 20 minutes.

Melbourne

In late 2008, a proposal was put forward to the Government of Victoria to build a privately funded and operated maglev line to service the Greater Melbourne metropolitan area in response to the Eddington Transport Report that did not investigate above-ground transport options. The maglev would service a population of over 4 million and the proposal was costed at A$8 billion.

However, despite road congestion and Australia's highest roadspace per capita, the government dismissed the proposal in favour of road expansion including an A$8.5 billion road tunnel, $6 billion extension of the Eastlink to the Western Ring Road and a $700 million Frankston Bypass.

Canada 
Toronto Zoo: Edmonton-based Magnovate has proposed a new ride and transportation system at the Toronto Zoo reviving the Toronto Zoo Domain Ride system, which was closed following two severe accidents in 1994. The Zoo's board unanimously approved the proposal on 29 November 2018.

The company will construct and operate the $25 million system on the former route of the Domain Ride (known locally as the Monorail, despite not being considered one) at zero cost to the Zoo and operate it for 15 years, splitting the profits with the Zoo. The ride will serve a single-directional loop around Zoo grounds, serving five stations and likely replacing the current Zoomobile tour tram service. Planned to be operational by 2022 at the earliest, this will become the first commercially operating maglev system in North America should it be approved.

China

Beijing – Guangzhou line
A maglev test line linking Xianning in Hubei Province and Changsha in Hunan Province will start construction in 2020. In 2021, the Guangdong government proposed a Maglev line between Hong Kong and Guangzhou via Shenzhen and beyond to Beijing.

Other proposed lines

Shanghai – Hangzhou

If built, this would be the first inter-city maglev rail line in commercial service.

The project was controversial and repeatedly delayed. In May 2007 the project was suspended by officials, reportedly due to public concerns about radiation from the system. In January and February 2008 hundreds of residents demonstrated in downtown Shanghai that the line route came too close to their homes, citing concerns about sickness due to exposure to the strong magnetic field, noise, pollution and devaluation of property near to the lines. Final approval to build the line was granted on 18 August 2008. Originally scheduled to be ready by Expo 2010, plans called for completion by 2014. The Shanghai municipal government considered multiple options, including building the line underground to allay public fears. This same report stated that the final decision had to be approved by the National Development and Reform Commission.

In 2007 the Shanghai municipal government was considering building a factory in Nanhui district to produce low-speed maglev trains for urban use.

Shanghai – Beijing

No projects had been revealed as of 2014.

Germany 
On 25 September 2007, Bavaria announced a high-speed maglev-rail service from Munich to its airport. The Bavarian government signed contracts with Deutsche Bahn and Transrapid with Siemens and ThyssenKrupp for the €1.85 billion project.

On 27 March 2008, the German Transport minister announced the project had been cancelled due to rising costs associated with constructing the track. A new estimate put the project between €3.2–3.4 billion.

Hong Kong 

Hong Kong is already connected to the Chinese high speed rail network by the Guangzhou–Shenzhen–Hong Kong Express Rail Link, which opened on Sunday 23 September 2018.

India 
Mumbai – Delhi: A project was presented to then Indian railway minister (Mamata Banerjee) by an American company to connect Mumbai and Delhi. Then Prime Minister Manmohan Singh said that if the line project was successful the Indian government would build lines between other cities and also between Mumbai Central and Chhatrapati Shivaji International Airport.

Chennai – Bangalore – Mysore: A detailed report was to be prepared and submitted by December 2012 for a line to connect Chennai to Mysore via Bangalore at a cost $26 million per kilometre, reaching speeds of 350 km/h.

Iran 
In May 2009, Iran and a German company signed an agreement to use maglev to link Tehran and Mashhad. The agreement was signed at the Mashhad International Fair site between Iranian Ministry of Roads and Transportation and the German company. The  line possibly could reduce travel time between Tehran and Mashhad to about 2.5 hours. Munich-based Schlegel Consulting Engineers said they had signed the contract with the Iranian ministry of transport and the governor of Mashad. "We have been mandated to lead a German consortium in this project," a spokesman said. "We are in a preparatory phase." The project could be worth between €10 billion and €12 billion, the Schlegel spokesman said.

Italy 
A first proposal was formalized in April 2008, in Brescia, by journalist Andrew Spannaus who recommended a high-speed connection between Malpensa airport to the cities of Milan, Bergamo and Brescia.

In March 2011, Nicola Oliva proposed a maglev connection between Pisa airport and the cities of Prato and Florence (Santa Maria Novella train station and Florence Airport). The travelling time would be reduced from the typical 1 hour 15 minutes to around 20 minutes. The second part of the line would be a connection to Livorno, to integrate maritime, aerial and terrestrial transport systems.

Malaysia/Singapore 
A Consortium led by UEM Group Bhd and ARA Group, proposed maglev technology to link Malaysian cities to Singapore. The idea was first mooted by YTL Group. Its technology partner then was said to be Siemens. High costs sank the proposal. The concept of a high-speed rail link from Kuala Lumpur to Singapore resurfaced. It was cited as a proposed "high impact" project in the Economic Transformation Programme (ETP) that was unveiled in 2010. Approval has been given for the Kuala Lumpur–Singapore high-speed rail project, but not using maglev technology.

Philippines 
Philtram Consortium's Cebu Monorail project will be initially built as a monorail system. In the future, it will be upgraded to a patented maglev technology named Spin-Induced Lenz's Law Magnetic Levitation Train.

Switzerland 
SwissRapide: The SwissRapide AG together with the SwissRapide Consortium was planning and developing the first maglev monorail system for intercity traffic between the country's major cities. SwissRapide was to be financed by private investors. In the long-term, the SwissRapide Express was to connect the major cities north of the Alps between Geneva and St. Gallen, including Lucerne and Basel. The first projects were Bern – Zurich, Lausanne – Geneva as well as Zurich – Winterthur. The first line (Lausanne – Geneva or Zurich – Winterthur) could go into service as early as 2020.

Swissmetro: An earlier project, Swissmetro AG envisioned a partially evacuated underground maglev (a vactrain). As with SwissRapide, Swissmetro envisioned connecting the major cities in Switzerland with one another. In 2011, Swissmetro AG was dissolved and the IPRs from the organisation were passed onto the EPFL in Lausanne.

United Kingdom 

London – Glasgow: A line was proposed in the United Kingdom from London to Glasgow with several route options through the Midlands, Northwest and Northeast of England. It was reported to be under favourable consideration by the government. The approach was rejected in the Government White Paper Delivering a Sustainable Railway published on 24 July 2007. Another high-speed link was planned between Glasgow and Edinburgh but the technology remained unsettled.

United States 
The Federal Railroad Administration and Maryland Department of Transportation are currently preparing an Environmental Impact Statement (EIS) to evaluate the potential impacts of constructing and operating the system's first leg between Washington, DC and Baltimore, Maryland with an intermediate stop at BWI Airport.

Union Pacific freight conveyor: Plans are under way by American railroad operator Union Pacific to build a  container shuttle between the Ports of Los Angeles and Long Beach, with UP's intermodal container transfer facility. The system would be based on "passive" technology, especially well-suited to freight transfer as no power is needed on board. The vehicle is a chassis that glides to its destination. The system is being designed by General Atomics.

California-Nevada Interstate Maglev: High-speed maglev lines between major cities of southern California and Las Vegas are under study via the California-Nevada Interstate Maglev Project. This plan was originally proposed as part of an I-5 or I-15 expansion plan, but the federal government ruled that it must be separated from interstate public work projects.

After the decision, private groups from Nevada proposed a line running from Las Vegas to Los Angeles with stops in Primm, Nevada; Baker, California; and other points throughout San Bernardino County into Los Angeles. Politicians expressed concern that a high-speed rail line out of state would carry spending out of state along with travelers.

The Pennsylvania Project: The Pennsylvania High-Speed Maglev Project corridor extends from the Pittsburgh International Airport to Greensburg, with intermediate stops in Downtown Pittsburgh and Monroeville. This initial project was claimed to serve approximately 2.4 million people in the Pittsburgh metropolitan area. The Baltimore proposal competed with the Pittsburgh proposal for a US$90 million federal grant.

San Diego-Imperial County airport: In 2006, San Diego commissioned a study for a maglev line to a proposed airport located in Imperial County. SANDAG claimed that the concept would be an "airports [sic] without terminals", allowing passengers to check in at a terminal in San Diego ("satellite terminals"), take the train to the airport and directly board the airplane. In addition, the train would have the potential to carry freight. Further studies were requested although no funding was agreed.

Orlando International Airport to Orange County Convention Center: In December 2012, the Florida Department of Transportation gave conditional approval to a proposal by American Maglev to build a privately run , 5-station line from Orlando International Airport to Orange County Convention Center. The Department requested a technical assessment and said there would be a request for proposals issued to reveal any competing plans. The route requires the use of a public right of way. If the first phase succeeded American Maglev would propose two further phases (of ) to carry the line to Walt Disney World.

San Juan – Caguas: A  maglev project was proposed linking Tren Urbano's Cupey Station in San Juan with two proposed stations in the city of Caguas, south of San Juan. The maglev line would run along Highway PR-52, connecting both cities. According to American Maglev project cost would be approximately US$380 million.

Incidents 
Two incidents involved fires. A Japanese test train in Miyazaki, MLU002, was completely consumed by a fire in 1991.

On 11 August 2006, a fire broke out on the commercial Shanghai Transrapid shortly after arriving at the Longyang terminal. People were evacuated without incident before the vehicle was moved about 1 kilometre to keep smoke from filling the station. NAMTI officials toured the SMT maintenance facility in November 2010 and learned that the cause of the fire was "thermal runaway" in a battery tray. As a result, SMT secured a new battery vendor, installed new temperature sensors and insulators and redesigned the trays.

On 22 September 2006, a Transrapid train collided with a maintenance vehicle on a test/publicity run in Lathen (Lower Saxony / north-western Germany). Twenty-three people were killed and ten were injured; these were the first maglev crash fatalities. The accident was caused by human error. Charges were brought against three Transrapid employees after a year-long investigation.

Safety becomes an ever greater concern with high-speed public transport due to the potentially large impact force and number of casualties. In the case of maglev trains and conventional high-speed rails, an incident could result from human error, including loss of power, or factors outside human control, such as ground movement, for example, caused by an earthquake.

See also 

 Bombardier Advanced Rapid Transit – Transit systems using Linear induction motors
 Electromagnetic suspension
 Ground effect train
 Hyperloop
 Land speed record for rail vehicles
 Launch loop would be a maglev system for launching to orbit or escape velocity
 Mass driver
 Nagahori Tsurumi-ryokuchi Line
Oleg Tozoni worked on a published non-linearly stabilised maglev design
 StarTram – a maglev launch system
 Transfer table

Notes

References

Further reading

External links 

United States Federal Railroad Administration
US MagneticGlide
The International Maglev Board Maglev professionals' info platform for all maglev transport systems and related technologies.
Maglev Net – Maglev News and Information
Japanese Railway Technical Research Institute (RTRI)

Magnetic Levitation for Transportation

 
Electrodynamics
Emerging technologies
Experimental and prototype high-speed trains
Magnetic propulsion devices